Philip Wexler (born 1943)  is Professor Emeritus at the Hebrew University of Jerusalem. He was first appointed in 2002 as Professor of Sociology of Education and then Unterberg Chair in Jewish Social and Educational History.  Since retirement, he has been Visiting Professor in the Faculty of Human and Social Sciences at the University of Wuppertal, Germany.

Biography
Wexler received a bachelor's degree from New York University and master's and doctoral degrees in sociology from Princeton University.

Wexler was William Scandling Professor of Sociology and Education at the University of Rochester. He then moved to Jerusalem where he did field research on newly religious youth, and studied Jewish mystical texts in Hebrew and Yiddish. While on leave from the Hebrew University, he served as Bronfman Professor at Brandeis University.

Academic work
Wexler is the author of a number of books in the fields of sociology of religion and sociology of education. He was Editor of the American Sociological Association journal, Sociology of Education. During 2008-2009, together with Jonathan Garb, he convened a year- long working group at the Institute of Advanced Studies in Jerusalem, on   “Sociology and Anthropology of Jewish Mysticism in Comparative Perspective.”  . The working group meetings and conferences produced a book, “After Spirituality: Studies in Comparative Mysticism,”

Books
The sociology of education : beyond equality Indianapolis : Bobbs-Merrill Co., 1976.
Critical social psychology Boston : Routledge & Kegan Paul, 1983. Held in 567 libraries according to WorldCat
Social analysis of education : after the new sociology London ; New York : Routledge & Kegan Paul, 1987
Critical theory nowLondon ; New York : Falmer Press, 1991
Becoming somebody : toward a social psychology of school London ; Washington, D.C. : Falmer Press, 1992
After postmodernism : education, politics, and identity (with 	R A Smith)  London ; Washington, D.C. : Falmer Press, 1995
Holy sparks : social theory, education, and religion  	New York : St. Martin's Press, 1996.  
The mystical society : an emerging social vision 	Boulder, Colo. : Westview Press, 2000
Mystical Interactions: Sociology, Jewish Mysticism and Education Los Angeles : Cherub Press, 2007
Symbolic Movement: Critique and Spirituality in Sociology of Education Rotterdam, The Netherlands : Sense Publishers,  2008
Social Theory in Education Primer New York : Peter Lang, 2009
Mystical Sociology: Toward a Cosmic Sociology New York : Peter Lang, 2013
Social Vision: The Lubavitcher Rebbe's Transformative Paradigm for the World Herder & Herder, 2019.

References

Living people
1943 births
Princeton University alumni
University of Rochester faculty
Academic staff of the Hebrew University of Jerusalem
Academic staff of the University of Wuppertal